Four Walls or 4 Walls may refer to:

4 Walls, 2015 album by f(x)
"4 Walls" (song), the album's title track
Four Walls (artist forum), 1980s–1990s artists collaborative event space
Four Walls (film), a 1928 silent movie
Four walls (filmmaking)
Four Walls, a 2000 Chris Shaffer album
"Four Walls" (Jim Reeves song), 1957
"Four Walls" (Broods song), 2014
"Four Walls" / "Paradise Circus", a 2011 collaboration between Massive Attack and Burial
"Four Walls", a song by Cast from All Change, 1995
"Four Walls", a song by Cheyenne Kimball from the 2006 album The Day Has Come
Also covered by Miley Cyrus on the 2008 album Breakout
"Four Walls", a song by While She Sleeps from the 2015 album Brainwashed
 "Four Walls", a song by Staind from the 1996 album Tormented

See also 
 The Fourth Wall (disambiguation)
 These Four Walls (disambiguation)